Philippopolis may refer to several cities named after Philip II, Philip V, or Philip the Arab:

Philippopolis in Arabia, a former name of Shahba, Syria
Philippopolis in Thessaly, a former name of Gomfoi, Greece
Phthiotic Thebes or Philippopolis in Thessaly, a former city in Greece
Philippopolis (Thracia), a former name of Plovdiv, Bulgaria
Council of Philippopolis, a synod held in 343, 344 or 347
Roman Catholic titular see of Philippopolis in Thracia
Duchy of Philippopolis, a crusader state established in 1204

See also
 Battle of Philippopolis (disambiguation)